was the nineteenth of twenty-four s, built for the Imperial Japanese Navy following World War I. When introduced into service, these ships were the most powerful destroyers in the world. They served as first-line destroyers through the 1930s, and remained formidable weapons systems well into the Pacific War.

History
Construction of the advanced Fubuki-class destroyers was authorized as part of the Imperial Japanese Navy's expansion program from fiscal 1923, intended to give Japan a qualitative edge with the world's most modern ships. The Fubuki class had performance that was a quantum leap over previous destroyer designs, so much so that they were designated . The large size, powerful engines, high speed, large radius of action and unprecedented armament gave these destroyers the firepower similar to many light cruisers in other navies. Sazanami, built at the Maizuru was the seventh in an improved series, which incorporated a modified gun turret which could elevate her main battery of Type 3 127 mm 50 caliber naval guns to 75° as opposed to the original 40°, thus permitting the guns to be used as dual purpose guns against aircraft. Sazanami laid down on 21 February 1930, launched on 6 June 1931 and commissioned on 19 May 1932. Originally assigned hull designation “Destroyer No. 53”, she was given the name Sazanami before her launch.

Operational history
On completion, Sazanami was assigned to the IJN 2nd Fleet. During the Second Sino-Japanese War, from 1937, Sazanami covered landing of Japanese forces in Shanghai and Hangzhou. From 1940, she was assigned to patrol and cover landings of Japanese forces in south China, and participated in the Invasion of French Indochina.

World War II history
At the time of the attack on Pearl Harbor, Sazanami was assigned to Destroyer Division 7 of the IJN 1st Air Fleet, and had deployed from Tateyama Naval Air Station as part of the force which bombarded Midway Atoll in the opening stages of the war.

Sazanami was subsequently part of the escort for the aircraft carriers  and  during air strikes against Ambon. She was subsequently part of the escort for the cruisers  and  during the Japanese invasion of the eastern Netherlands East Indies. On 2 March, at the Battle of the Java Sea, Sazanami assisted in attacking the submarine . She returned to Yokosuka Naval Arsenal for repairs at the end of March.

At the end of April, Sazanami escorted the aircraft carrier  to Truk, and subsequently joined Admiral Takeo Takagi’s force at the Battle of the Coral Sea. At the end the battle, she rescued 225 survivors, and returned to Yokosuka via Saipan , and was subsequently based at Ōminato Guard District for patrols of northern waters until mid-July.

On 14 July, Sazanami was reassigned to the Combined Fleet, and escorted the battleship  and aircraft carrier  at the Battle of the Eastern Solomons on 24 August. Throughout the month of September, Sazanami was assigned to numerous "Tokyo Express" transport missions to various locations in the Solomon Islands. In early October, Sazanami escorted the damaged Taiyō to Kure Naval Arsenal for repairs, and went into dry dock at Yokosuka Naval Arsenal herself. Through the rest of 1943, Sazanami continued to serve as an escort for Unyō, and Taiyō between Yokosuka and Truk and Kavieng through August. Sazanami was flagship for Rear Admiral Matsuji Ijuin during the Battle off Horaniu, where she covered landings of troops on Vella Lavella. After helping evacuate surviving Japanese forces from Rekata at the end of the month, Sazanami resumed her former role as escort to various aircraft carriers through the end of the year.

On 1 January 1944, Sazanami was reassigned to the IJN 5th Fleet. On 12 January, Sazanami departed Rabaul to join a tanker convoy en route from Palau to Truk. Of her crew, 153 died; 89 survivors were rescued by her sister ship .

On 10 March 1944, Sazanami was removed from the navy list.

References

Bibliography

External links

Fubuki-class destroyers
Ships built by Maizuru Naval Arsenal
1931 ships
Second Sino-Japanese War naval ships of Japan
World War II destroyers of Japan
Ships sunk by American submarines
World War II shipwrecks in the Pacific Ocean
Maritime incidents in January 1944